Mole is a surname. Notable people with the surname include:

 Charles Mole (1886–1962), British architect
 Chris Mole (born 1958), UK Labour Member of Parliament
 Fenton Mole (1925–2017), American baseball player
 Jamie Mole (born 1988), English professional footballer
 Louis-Mathieu Molé (1781–1855), French statesman 
 Miff Mole (1898–1961), American jazz trombonist and band leader
 Matthew Mole (born 1991), South African singer, songwriter, and musician

Fictional characters:
 Adrian Mole, fictional diarist in a series of comic novels by Sue Townsend
 Rosie Mole, Adrian's sister